The Hyp-Doctor was an 18th-century weekly paper edited and produced by John 'Orator Henley'. It was a pro-Walpole newspaper established in opposition to another periodical of the period, entitled the Craftsman.

The first number of The Hyp-Doctor appeared on 15 December 1730, and it ceased publication in 1741.

References

Defunct newspapers published in the United Kingdom
Publications established in 1730
Year of disestablishment missing
1730 establishments in Great Britain